Amphidromus givenchyi is a species of air-breathing land snail, a terrestrial pulmonate gastropod mollusk in the family Camaenidae.

Distribution
Distribution of include Ubon Ratchathani Province and Kalasin Province in Thailand and Luang Prabang Province, Savannakhet Province and Salavan Province in Laos.

References

 Thach N.N. (2017). New shells of Southeast Asia. Sea shells & Land snails. 48HrBooks Company. 128 pp.
 Thach N.N. (2019). On differences between Amphidromus richgoldbergi Thach & Huber, 2017 and Amphidromus givenchi Geret, 1912. American Conchologist. 47(3): 14-15

External links
 Geret, P. (1912). Description ďun nouvel Amphidromus. Journal de Conchyliologie. 60: 55–56

givenchyi
Gastropods described in 1912